Blitz//Berlin is a Canadian trio of composers based in Los Angeles, California. They are known for composing the music to Blade Runner 2036: Nexus Dawn, as well as numerous feature films and trailers.

Born and raised in Victoria BC, high school friends Martin Macphail, Dean Rode, and Tristan Tarr began their film composing career in Toronto, Canada in 2014. The group relocated to Los Angeles, California in 2018.

The trio first achieved international recognition in 2016 for their award winning song "Surfboard Fire" composed for the official trailer for The Girl on the Train, featuring a sample of Kanye West's "Heartless". Soon after, Blitz//Berlin composed the original scores to the critically acclaimed feature films The Void and Still/Born. Additionally, their continued trailer work includes Top Gun: Maverick, Bad Times at the El Royale, The Girl in the Spider's Web, Bird Box, and many others.

In 2021, Blitz//Berlin received their second nomination for a Juno Award for Instrumental album of the year for their album Movements III.

Discography

Awards

References

Canadian electronic music groups
Musical groups from Toronto
Musical groups established in 2013
2013 establishments in Ontario
Canadian instrumental musical groups
Juno Award for Instrumental Album of the Year winners